Sharhorod, also known as Shargorod, is a town located within the Vinnytsia Oblast, Ukraine. It serves as the administrative center of Sharhorod Raion, one of 33 regions of Vinnytsia Oblast. Population:

History

Early history
Sharhorod was founded in 1579 by Polish–Lithuanian Commonwealth chancellor and hetman, Jan Zamoyski. It was located very close to the border with the Ottoman Empire.

Sharhorod was established as a city under Magdeburg law in 1588.

In the seventeenth century,  because of its location along wine and cattle trading routes, Sharhorod emerged as one of the largest towns in Podolia.  The Turks occupied Sharhorod between 1672 and 1699, when the town was called "Little Istanbul". During that time the synagogue was converted into a mosque. In the nineteenth century, the town became a center of Jewish Hasidism.

Rabbi Jacob Joseph of Polonne fled to Raşcov as a result of being exiled from Sharhorod. Having been the rabbi of Sharhorod for several years, Rabbi Jacob Joseph was expelled from his position on a Friday afternoon in 1748. In several of his responsa, which he wrote in Raşcov, he reveals the suffering which he had undergone. He would later leave Raşcov after being appointed rabbi in Nemirov, a center of Hasidism, where he practiced daily fasting for five years, until the Besht came upon him.

Sharhorod was briefly described in a book titled: "Geographic Dictionary of Polish Kingdom and other Slavic places," published in Warsaw in Poland.

World War II period
Shargorod was occupied by the German fascist army and then by the Romanian fascist army during  World War II in 1941–1945. Five thousand Jews were deported to Shargorod from Bessarabia and Bukovina, adding to the 2,000 who were already there.  Around  seven thousand Jewish people were kept in a ghetto, created by the German fascist army and by the Romanian fascist army in Shargorod. Many of the Jews in this ghetto either died of disease or were deported to labor camps,  and by 1943 there were about 3,000 Jews left.

Religious buildings

Orthodox
There is the St. Nicolas Orthodox Monastery, which was founded in Shargorod in 1719, initially constructed in 1782, and finally built in 1806–1818.

Catholic
There is the St. Florian Catholic Cathedral, which was opened in Shargorod on November 3, 1525.

Jewish
There is the Synagogue, which was built in Shargorod in 1589.

Culture
The international modern arts festival "Art-City: Shargorod" is conducted in Shargorod.

Professional painters, amateur painters, art collectors and tourists from various countries like to attend the international modern arts festival "Art-City: Shargorod".

Transportation

Railway transportation
The name of nearest railway station is the Yaroshenka railway station. The distance to the nearest railway station is 28 km.

Automobile transportation
There is a bus station downtown. The distance to Zmerynka is 37 km. The distance to Bar, Ukraine is around 60 km. The distance to Vinnytsia is 80,8 km. The distance to Kyiv is 330 km.

Notable people
Jacob Joseph of Polonne, a Ukrainian rabbi and one of the first and most dedicated of the disciples of the founder of Chassidut, the Holy Baal Shem Tov.

Gallery

Further reading

Tombstones Define Dying Shtetl in Ukraine, Los Angeles Times, 1997

References

Cities in Vinnytsia Oblast
Cities of district significance in Ukraine
Mogilyovsky Uyezd (Podolian Governorate)
Shtetls
Holocaust locations in Ukraine